Galileo is a 1.1petaFLOPS supercomputer located at CINECA in Bologna, Italy.

History
GALILEO is available in Cineca since January 2015, in full production since February, the 2-nd, sponsored by the Ministry of Education, Universities and Research (Italy), the Istituto Nazionale di Fisica Nucleare and the University of Milano-Bicocca. It is the Italian National Tier-1 HPC machine, devoted to scientific computing as well as technical oriented applications. Galileo is also available to European researchers as a Tier-1 system of the PRACE 
 infrastructure.

In June 2015, Galileo reached the 105-th position on the TOP500 list of fastest supercomputers in the world.

In the Green500 list of top supercomputers. Galileo reached the 389-th position in their benchmark, the system tested at 242.17 MFLOPS/W (Performance per watt).

Technical details 
Galileo is an IBM Linux infiniband cluster,  with a NeXtScale architecture. It is made of 516 compute nodes. Each node contains 2x8-cores Intel Haswell processors (2.40 GHz) and a shared memory of 128 GB. The internal network is Infiniband with 4xQDR switches. The cluster is accessible though 8 login nodes, also user for visualization, reachable via ssh at the address login.galileo.cineca.it. The login nodes are equipped with 2 nVidia K40 GPU each. On the cluster there are also 8 service nodes NX360M5 for I/O and management.
The Operating system for both executable and login nodes is CentOS 7.0.

Galileo is an heterogeneous hybrid cluster: 359 nodes are equipped with Intel accelerators (Intel Phi 7120p), 2 accelerators per node for a total of 768 Phi in the system; 40 nodes are equipped with nVidia accelerators (nVidia K80), 2 accelerators per node for a total of 80 K80 in the system.

See also
 Supercomputing in Europe

References

External links
 La Repubblica in Italian
 Corriere Comunicazioni in Italian
 ResearchItaly  in Italian
 Primeur Magazine 
 RaiNews in Italian

GPGPU supercomputers
IBM supercomputers
Supercomputing in Europe
X86 supercomputers